Ivana Petković (born 6 June 1985 in Metković) is a Croatian team handball player. She plays on the Croatian national team, and participated at the 2011 World Women's Handball Championship in Brazil.

References

1985 births
Living people
Croatian female handball players
Sportspeople from Metković